Buka (also Boka or Booka), is the name for the cloak traditionally worn by Noongar peoples, the Indigenous peoples of south-western Australia.
 
Unlike in the south-east, where peoples such as Yorta Yorta wore possum-skin cloaks, Noongars peoples generally use the pelt of the kangaroo. While in the southeast, there was much sewing involved, there was less involved in the south-west. The buka normally consists of the whole skin of two to three kangaroos sewn together, with the tail hanging at the bottom of the cloak. The skins were sewn together using kangaroo sinew or rushes. 
 
The cloak was worn over one shoulder and under the other. It was fastened at the neck using a small piece of bone or wood. Wearing the cloak in this way allowed for unrestricted movement of both arms, enabling daily activities to be carried out with ease. Cloaks were reversible: they were worn with the fur on the inside when it was particularly cold, and could be turned the other way when it was raining. The cloaks were also used as rugs to sleep on at night.  

Today many Aboriginal people have new cloaks and rugs made from kangaroo skins. They are used in performances or worn for warmth. Ken Wyatt, Australia's first Indigenous cabinet minister, wore a traditional buka when delivering his first speech to parliament in 2010.

See also
Noongar
Possum-skin cloak

References

History of Western Australia
Robes and cloaks
Noongar
History of Oceanian clothing
Australian inventions
Australian Aboriginal clothing